Anne Schäfer (born 1 March 1987) is a German tennis player.

Schäfer has won twenty-one singles and nine doubles titles on the ITF Women's Circuit in her career. On 23 March 2009, she reached her best singles ranking of world No. 161. On 25 July 2016, she peaked at No. 211 in the WTA doubles rankings.

Schäfer made her WTA Tour main-draw singles debut at the 2016 Copa Colsanitas, where she defeated qualifier Chloé Paquet in the first round.

Education
Schäfer completed her abitur in Thuringia, and studied Economics at the University of Hagen.

ITF Circuit finals

Singles: 45 (21–24)

Doubles: 20 (9–11)

References

External links

  
 
 

1987 births
Living people
People from Apolda
German female tennis players
University of Hagen alumni